The coroneted fruit dove (Ptilinopus coronulatus), also known as the lilac-capped fruit dove, is a species of bird in the family Columbidae. It is found in New Guinea. Its natural habitats are subtropical or tropical dry forests and subtropical or tropical moist lowland forests. The bird is characterised by a distinctive crest or "coronet" of feathers on its head and has a distinctive, low-pitched call. The Coroneted Fruit Dove is a brightly coloured bird with a green head, neck and breast, and a yellow belly.

References

coroneted fruit dove
Birds of New Guinea
coroneted fruit dove
coroneted fruit dove
Taxonomy articles created by Polbot